Larry Berrio (born Larry Barriault in Sudbury, Ontario, Canada) is a Canadian country music singer. Berrio's debut album, RPM, was released in March 2009 by 306 Records. The album was produced and recorded with Gil Grand and Brady Seals together with band members from Jason Aldean's band in Nashville. He was the featured artist online CMT from 13 to 26 July 2009. His single "In the Rough" became the new intro song for Canada in the Rough when season 6 was launched in January 2010.

Berrio released his second album in February 2015. The new record is produced by Brian Allen and engineered by Jason Barry out of Barrytones Studios.

Discography

Albums

Extended plays

Singles

Music videos

References

External links

Larry Berrio at CMT
Larry Berrio at Canadian Musicians

Canadian country singers
Canadian male singers
Living people
306 Records artists
Musicians from Greater Sudbury
Franco-Ontarian people
1968 births